Bill or William Cline may refer to:

Milton William Cline (1825–1911), American sailor, soldier, scout and pioneer
William Cline Borden (1858–1934), American surgeon and key planner of Walter Reed Army Medical Center
William Cline (cinematographer) (1903–1976), American film and TV director of photography, a/k/a Wilfrid M. Cline
William A. Cline (1910–2012), American defense attorney in 1944 Court-Martial of Jackie Robinson
William C. Cline, American film historian during 1960s–1990s specializing in serials (King of the Rocket Men)
William R. Cline (born 1941), American economist, Senior Fellow at Peterson Institute for International Economics
Bill Cline (born 1943), Canadian football player

See also
William G. Kline (1882—after 1942), American football, baseball and basketball coach
William Klyne (1913–1977), English organic chemist and academic, a/k/a Bill Klyne
William Klein (disambiguation)